Anoop Trevedi is an actor/director/writer, engaged with the theatre since childhood. His Guru is Habib Tanvir. Presently he is working as a Theatre Consultant at Guru Gobind Singh Indraprastha University, New Delhi. He was Associated with National School of Drama Repertory Co. New Delhi from 2006-2013 as an actor/director. He received Ustad Bismillah Khan Yuva Puraskar'2007 by Sangeet Natak Academy for his contribution in theatre (acting). Acted in more than 50 plays with many prestigious theatre companies with eminent theatre directors of India. He has also acted in films like-aamir khan production's peepli [live] as Thanedar Jugan and Deepa Mehta's film based on Salman Rushdie's Novel Mid Night's Children, Miss Tanakpur Hazir Ho, Wah Taj, Hindi Medium, Batti Gul Meter Chalu & few more.

Year of birth missing (living people)
Living people
Indian male stage actors
Indian male film actors